Erling Johannes Norvik (27 April 1899–27 November 1964) was a Norwegian politician for the Conservative Party.  He was a member of the Norwegian Parliament and was briefly the acting County Governor of Finnmark county from September 1945 until November 1945 at the end of World War II.

Personal life
He was born to Peder Norvik and Lea Margrethe Hansen on 27 April 1899 in Trondenes in Nordland county, Norway.  He was married to Andrea Esbensen.   Erling Norvik is their son.  Erling Johannes Norvik died on 27 November 1964 in Vadsø in Finnmark county, Norway at the age of 64.

Education and career
He graduated from the Trondhjems Handelsgymnasium school in 1917. Norvik was very active in politics.  He chaired the local Conservative Party chapter several times (1925-1926, 1939-1940, 1948), as well as the regional chapter (1948-1952).  He was also a member of the national Conservative Party board from 1950 to 1961.

He began his career as a clerk for the Finnmark County Municipality in 1918. He later became a secretary for the county tax administration office in Finnmark from 1926-1935. Norvik was a member of Vadsø Municipality council from 1931 to 1936.  After the occupation of Norway was ended there was no government in Finnmark county, so he was appointed to temporarily be the county governor from September to November 1945.  Shortly after that, he was appointed to the executive committee which ran Vadsø from 1947–1951.  Norvik was head of the tax office in Finnmark from 1948-1962. 

He was elected to the Norwegian Parliament for the Conservative Party for the constituency of the "Market towns of Nordland, Troms and Finnmark" for the term from 1950-1953.  In 1953, he was re-elected, but for the constituency of Finnmark county.  He was reelected in 1957 to represent Finnmark.  He was also member of the Supervisory Board of Norges Bank from 1957-1964.

References

1899 births
1964 deaths
Conservative Party (Norway) politicians
Finnmark politicians
Members of the Storting
County governors of Norway
People from Vadsø
20th-century Norwegian politicians